Alleyn Prospere (birth 10 October 1979 in St Lucia) is a former Saint Lucian cricketer who played for the Saint Lucia national cricket team in Stanford 20/20 in West Indian domestic cricket. He played as a right-handed batsman as well as right-arm offbreak bowler.

References

External links
 Player profile and statistics at CricketArchive
 Player profile and statistics at ESPNcricinfo

1982 births
Living people
Saint Lucian cricketers
Windward Islands cricketers